Josh Thomas is a West Indian cricketer. He made his first-class debut on 6 December 2018, for the Windward Islands in the 2018–19 Regional Four Day Competition.

References

External links
 

Year of birth missing (living people)
Living people
Grenadian cricketers
Windward Islands cricketers
Place of birth missing (living people)